Canada competed at the 1920 Summer Olympics in Antwerp, Belgium. 52 competitors, all men, took part in 38 events in 9 sports. These games marked the introduction of winter sports to the Olympic program (competed in April 1920); Canada won its first gold medal for ice hockey.

Medalists

Gold
 Winnipeg Falcons (Robert Benson, Walter Byron, Frank Fredrickson, Chris Fridfinnson, Magnus Goodman, Haldor Halderson, Konrad Johannesson, Allan Woodman) – Ice hockey, men's competition
 Earl Thomson – Athletics, men's 110 m hurdles
 Bert Schneider – Boxing, men's welterweight

Silver
 Clifford Graham – Boxing, men's bantamweight
 Georges Prud'Homme – Boxing, men's middleweight
 George Vernot – Swimming, men's 1500 m freestyle

Bronze
 Clarence Newton – Boxing, men's lightweight
 Moe Herscovitch – Boxing, men's middleweight
 George Vernot – Swimming, men's 400 m freestyle

Aquatics

Diving

A single diver represented Canada in 1920. It was the nation's third appearance in the sport. Flint competed in all three of the men's events, but did not reach the final in any.

 Men

Ranks given are within the semifinal group.

Swimming

Three swimmers, all male, represented Canada in 1920. It was the nation's third appearance in the sport. Hodgson was unable to successfully defend his 1912 championships in the 400 and 1500 metre freestyle events, not even reaching the final in either; Vernot took a bronze and a silver in those events.

Ranks given are within the heat.

 Men

Athletics

14 athletes represented Canada in 1920. It was the nation's fifth appearance in the sport, having competed in athletics every time the country competed at the Olympics. The best result for the team was Thomson's gold medal in the high hurdles, as Canada took a gold medal in athletics for the fifth straight Games.

Ranks given are within the heat.

Boxing 

The Canadian Olympic Committee named W. A. Hewitt to its sub-committee for boxing to select who represented Canada at the Olympics, and had been credited with officiating hundreds of bouts as a boxing referee in Toronto. He oversaw travel arrangements for the national team to the remainder of the 1920 Summer Olympics which began in August. The boxers which he helped select won one gold, two silver, and two bronze medals for Canada.

Cycling

Five cyclists represented Canada in 1920. It was the nation's third appearance in the sport. Macdonald's fifth-place finish in the 50 kilometres was the best result of the Games for the Canadian cyclists.

Road cycling

Track cycling

Ranks given are within the heat.

Ice hockey

The Canadian Amateur Hockey Association (CAHA) chose the Winnipeg Falcons as the 1920 Allan Cup champions to represent the Canada men's national team in ice hockey at the 1920 Summer Olympics, instead of forming a national all-star team on short notice. W. A. Hewitt represented the Canadian Olympic Committee and oversaw finances for the Falcons, and reported on the Olympic Games for Canadian newspapers. He and his wife were a father and mother figure to the Falcons, and sailed with them aboard  from Saint John to Liverpool, then onto Antwerp.

Hewitt introduced the CAHA rules of play to the Ligue Internationale de Hockey sur Glace (LIHG) at the Olympics. Writer Andrew Podnieks described Hewitt's interpretation of the rules as "competitive yet gentlemanly", and that the rules of play were accepted for Olympic hockey. Hewitt refereed the first Olympic hockey game played, an 8–0 win by the Sweden men's national team versus the Belgium men's national team, on April 23, 1920. The Falcons and the Hewitts returned home aboard  from Le Havre to Quebec City. The Falcons honoured Hewitt and his wife at a private dinner and presented them with a silver cup inscribed with the number 13, for the number of people who made the trip to the Olympics and the team's lucky number.

 Roster
Coach:  Guðmundur Sigurjónsson

 Gold medal quarterfinals

 Gold medal semifinals

 Gold medal game

Final rank  Gold

Rowing

Five rowers represented Canada in 1920. It was the nation's fourth straight appearance in the sport. Canada sent one boat, in the coxed fours. It was unable to advance past the semifinals, taking third place in the three-boat heat.

Ranks given are within the heat.

Shooting

Seven shooters represented Canada in 1920. It was the nation's third appearance in the sport. For the second straight Games, the Canadian shooters were unable to earn any medals.

Wrestling

A single wrestler competed for Canada in 1920. It was the nation's second appearance in the sport.

Freestyle

References

Sources

External links
 

Nations at the 1920 Summer Olympics
1920
Olympics